Lysocardiolipin acyltransferase 1 is a protein that in humans is encoded by the LCLAT1 gene.

References

Further reading